The 1960 Ethiopian coup d'etat attempt (Amharic: የታህሳሱ ግርግር) was an attempted coup d'etat and a series of shootouts in the Ethiopian Empire on 13 December 1960 against Emperor Haile Selassie. The Council of the Revolution, four conspirators led by brothers Germame Neway and Brigadier General Mengistu Neway, commander of the Kebur Zabagna (Imperial Bodyguard), sought to overthrow the Emperor during a state visit to Brazil in order to install a progressive government. The coup leaders declared the beginning of a new government under the rule of Haile Selassie's eldest son, Crown Prince Asfaw Wossen, that would address the numerous economic and social problems Ethiopia faced. The Council gained control of most of the capital city, Addis Ababa, and took several ministers and other important people hostage. After its initial success, the majority of the military and populace quickly aligned against the coup, and by 17 December loyalists had regained control of Addis Ababa. At least 300 people were killed during the coup, including most of the conspirators.

The coup attempt is considered the most serious threat to Haile Selassie's rule between 1941 and his deposition in 1974 during the Ethiopian Revolution.

Background

Germame Neway, widely seen as the motivator of the coup, was a high-ranking civil servant who was serving as a district governor in Ethiopia's provinces. Germame was a progressive and activist governor who was frustrated in his attempts to improve the standard of living of the subjects in the districts he was assigned to govern, and grew to resent the absolutist and feudal central government under Emperor Haile Selassie. When Germame had attempted to encourage the Oromo inhabitants of Wellamu to build roads, bridges, and schools, he was opposed by the local landlords who agitated for his replacement. Germame was then reassigned to Jijiga, where he "was immediately confronted with the abject poverty and underdevelopment of the region and with obvious signs of official neglect." Concludes Bahru Zewde, "The obstruction he encountered even in these remote posts convinced him of the need for change, and he began to work with his brother to that end."

Germame then managed to persuade his brother, Brigadier-General Mengistu Neway, that a successful military coup against the current government was feasible. Mengistu was vital to the success of Germame's plan because he commanded the Kebur Zabangna, the Emperor's imperial guard whose members were expected to follow orders without question, and had connections throughout the Ethiopian armed forces. Two more important members, Colonel Warqenah Gabayahu, imperial Chief of Security, and Brigadier-General Tsege Dibu, the Commissioner of Police, were recruited to form a clandestine "Council of the Revolution", and the group began planning their move. According to Paul Henze, fearing that their plans had already leaked out, the conspirators rushed into action when the Emperor departed on a state visit to Brazil without sufficient planning. According to the memoirs of John H. Spencer, Makonnen Habte-Wold had been seriously suspicious of Colonel Warqenah's activities two years prior to the attempted coup, and only five months before the conspirators acted Makonnen confided his renewed suspicions about both the Colonel as well as Brigadier-General Tsege to Spencer.

Coup
On the evening of Tuesday, 13 December 1960, the group duped several Ministers of the Imperial Crown and other important political personages into coming to Guenete Leul Palace in the capital, Addis Ababa, for an emergency meeting. They then were taken hostage, including Prime Minister Ras Abebe Aregai. At the same time, followers of Colonel Warqenah occupied the central bank, the radio station, and the Ministry of Finance. The Kebur Zabagna surrounded the other army bases in and around the capital.

The next morning, after the members of the coup had secured control of most of Addis Ababa, Crown Prince Asfaw Wossen, who is generally regarded as having acted under duress, read a proclamation. This proclamation attacked Ethiopia's economic backwardness in relation to other African countries, announced the formation of a new government under the Crown Prince, and promised the start of a new era. In response, the students of Haile Selassie University demonstrated in support of the new government.

The leaders of the coup obviously expected this demonstration would convince the other branches of the military to join them. An uneasy 24 hours followed while the conspirators awaited developments. During this period Mengestu and his colleagues issued an 11-point programme of proposed reforms, and appointed as Prime Minister Ras Imru Haile Selassie and Major General Mulugeta Bulli, who was popular in the army, as Chief of Staff. Meanwhile, the loyalists within the military were able to come to a consensus on how to respond to this threat. (Clapham shows that the civilian leaders, who in previous coups that created new rulers of Ethiopia, had been effectively isolated from the military. Makonnen Habte-Wold, whose own intelligence network had uncovered this plot, was unable to do more than send frantic telegrams to his Emperor "until the coup took place and he was captured and shot.") Dejazmach Asrate Medhin Kassa, Major General Mared Mangesha, and the other loyalists spent their time more usefully; they secured the support of the tank squadron and the Imperial Ethiopian Air Force, both stationed within reach of the capital, and made up their initial shortage of troops by airlifting about 1,000 loyal soldiers in from outlying provinces; they also issued leaflets signed by Abuna Basilios, head of the Ethiopian Orthodox Tewahedo Church, which condemned the rebels as anti-religious traitors and called for loyalty to Haile Selassie. These leaflets are believed to have had a great effect on the uncommitted.

Fighting broke out in the afternoon of the next day. Heavily outnumbered, the rebels were slowly driven back. Many ordinary soldiers of the Kebur Zabagna, once they learned they were fighting against the Emperor, lost heart as they had been given to understand that they were fighting for him. Once the fighting started, the inhabitants of the capital gave their support to the loyalists. Before abandoning the capital, Germame and the others turned their machine-guns on their hostages in Genetta Leul palace, killing 15 of them. Within the victims were Prime Minister Aregai, Makonnen Habte-Wold, and Major General Mulugeta.

General Tsege was killed in the fighting; Colonel Warqenah committed suicide. Mengistu and Germame evaded capture until 24 December 1960 when they were surrounded by the army near Mojo. Rather than face capture, Germame committed suicide; Mengistu surrendered. He was publicly hanged in a church square a few months later. Germame's body was brought to Addis Ababa and hanged as well, as a manner of demonstrating the Emperor's resolve. Official casualty figures state that at least 300 people were killed, many of them civilians caught in the street fighting; Christopher Clapham considers them "likely to be underestimates", noting in a footnote that The East African Standard in Nairobi, in what was then Kenya Colony, estimated about 2,000 dead and wounded in its 20 December 1960 story.

Aftermath

Although Paul Henze asks the relevant question, "Was the 1960 coup the harbinger of the revolution of 1974?", he denies that there was a significant connection with his next sentence: "Only in a very general sense, if at all." Henze emphasises the inside nature of the coup, how much of the population of Ethiopia was illiterate and had little awareness of events in the capital city. However, Henze admits that the threat to his rule caused a change in the Emperor's behaviour: after reorganising his government and appointing the Tsehafi Taezaz ('Minister of the Pen'), Aklilu Habte-Wold, as Prime Minister, Haile Selassie "gave less attention to domestic affairs and devoted more time to foreign affairs, making a place for himself in the Pan-African movement and championing decolonization. ... Not to be overshadowed by many of the new personalities on the African scene – Nkrumah, Sekou Toure, Kenyatta, Nyerere – he continued to take a leading role in Pan-African politics."

In contrast, Ethiopian historian Bahru Zewde finds a very clear chain of connection between the two events. First, in his history of modern Ethiopia, Bahru points out an ironic element in this event: "By his colleagues he [Mulugeti Bulli] was more than half-expected to emulate the Egyptian colonel, Gamal Abdel Nasser, who staged a coup in 1952 that overthrew the dynasty, a century and a half old, of Mohammed Ali." Yet Professor Bahru draws an even more apparent connection between the two, in a strikingly elegiac passage:
 The torch of change that the rebels had kindled was not extinguished with their physical elimination. On the contrary, it sparked a more outspoken and radical opposition to the regime. This can be seen in some of the underground leaflets that began to circulate soon after the end of the coup. They had such uncompromising motifs as "Better be a lion for a day and die than live the life of a lamb for a thousand days", "There is no solution without blood", and "What is sinful is to be ruled by despots, not to rise against them." Above all, the students became the true heirs of the rebels. They had come out on the streets in support of the rebels in 1960. Thereafter, they gave breadth and coherence to the opposition that the rebels had conceived and executed in such a confused manner. As for the imperial régime, unprepared to concede reform, it condemned itself to being swept away by revolution.

Edmond Keller adds that following the coup, "rather than being able to dictate comfortably the rate and direction of change, the emperor was placed ever more on the defensive, having to work harder to mediate the demands of increasingly politically significant social groupings." Keller also disagrees with the assertion that the leaders of the coup were the only organised group critical of the imperial monarchy and its policies, pointing to nationalist organisations coalescing among the Oromo, Somali, Eritreans, and Tigreans, noting that "these pockets of opposition might never have emerged if the emperor's policies had been more sensitively directed at building legitimacy among the masses rather than simply at securing compliance or acquiescence to laws and policies."

References

Further reading
 John Michael Cohen, "Traditional Politics and the Military Coup in Ethiopia", African Affairs, 74 (1975), pp. 222-248
 Richard Greenfield, Ethiopia: a new political history (London and New York, 1965), pp. 337–452.
 Reidulf Knut Molvaer, "About the Abortive Coup Attempt in Addis Ababa from 5 Tahsas to 8 Tahsas 1953 (14-17 December 1960)", North Eastern African Studies, 3 (1996), pp. 21-38

1960 in Ethiopia
1960s coups d'état and coup attempts
Attempted coups in Ethiopia
Conflicts in 1960
December 1960 events in Africa
Haile Selassie